Paris Vice Squad is a 1951 French thriller film directed by Hervé Bromberger. It was entered into the 1951 Cannes Film Festival.

Cast
 Odette Barencey as La concierge (as Odette Barancey)
 Luc Barney as Mauduit
 Robert Berri as Inspecteur Paulan [Insp. Robbie Berni, US]
 André Carnège as Le directeur de la P.J.
 Nicole Cezanne as Denise Prévost (as Nicole Cezannes)
 René-Jean Chauffard as Le chimiste (as Chauffard)
 Jean Debucourt as Max Berthet [Max Barton, US]
 Dora Doll as Dora Bourbon [Dora Barton, US]
 Danielle Godet as Madeleine
 Camille Guérini as Husson
 Raoul Marco as Le médecin
 Renaud Mary as Mario Petrosino
 Marthe Mercadier as Rose Muchet [Prostitute from Brooklyn, US]
 Eliane Monceau as Mme de Sannois
 Max Révol as Le voleur

References

External links

1951 films
1950s French-language films
1950s thriller films
French black-and-white films
Films directed by Hervé Bromberger
French thriller films
1950s French films